Makonn is an abstract strategy game from the Seychelles islands off the eastern coast of Africa.  The game is a traditional variant of mancala.  It is played on four rows of ten holes such as a 10 x 4 hole board.  There are variants, and the board design, number of pieces, and rules may change.  This game was almost forgotten and is played mostly on the outer islands of the Seychelles.  The rules provided in this article are not complete, and this article attempts only to provide a general description of the game based on the available sources.

Game play and rules
The goal is to capture the most pieces.  The board design and size may vary depending on the variant played.  Perhaps a more common variant is the 10 x 4 hole board.  It is unknown how many pieces there are in the game, and whether any of the pieces belong to any of the players.  Each player controls two rows of holes.  All moves are capturing moves.  A capturing move is when one piece jumps across another piece.

Abstract strategy games
Traditional mancala games
African games